Leslie Elmer Goldstein (May 13, 1918 – January 28, 2013) was a first baseman in Major League Baseball who played briefly for the Cincinnati Reds during the  and  seasons. He batted and threw left-handed.
 
A native of Austin, Texas, Goldstein was one of many major leaguers who saw his baseball career interrupted by a military stint during World War II. In 1943 he appeared in five games as a backup for first baseman Frank McCormick. He enrolled in the United States Army in 1944, serving for two and half years before rejoining the Reds in the 1946 midseason as a reserve player and pinch hitter.

In a two-season career, Goldstein was a .100 hitter (1-for-10) with a run scored and a .308 on-base percentage in 11 games.

Goldstein died on January 28, 2013, at the age of 94.

External links

Retrosheet
Baseball in Wartime

1918 births
2013 deaths
United States Army personnel of World War II
Baseball players from Austin, Texas
Birmingham Barons players
Cincinnati Reds players
Columbia Reds players
Corpus Christi Clippers players
Gainesville Owls players
Major League Baseball first basemen
Minor league baseball managers
Syracuse Chiefs players
Temple Eagles players
Texas Wesleyan Rams baseball players
Texas Wesleyan University alumni
Yuma Sun Sox players